Fernando Currás Gallego (born 19 February 1977) is a Spanish retired footballer who played as a midfielder, and most recently the  manager of UD Melilla.

Club career
Born in Ourense, Galicia, Currás graduated with CD Ourense's youth setup. He made his senior debuts with the reserves, playing several seasons in the regional leagues.

On 21 December 1996 Currás played his first professional match, starting in a 0–2 away loss against SD Eibar in the Segunda División championship. He was definitely promoted to the main squad in June of the following year, playing regularly afterwards.

In the 1999 summer Currás joined Getafe CF, also in the second level. He left the club in the following year and subsequently resumed his career in Segunda División B, representing CF Gandía, AD Alcorcón, Real Jaén, CD Ourense and UD Melilla; he retired with the latter in 2010, aged 32.

Manager career
On 9 February 2011 Currás was appointed Andrés García Tébar's assistant at his last professional club, Mellilla. On 11 May 2014 he was appointed as manager, replacing Juan Moya.

References

External links
 
 

1977 births
Living people
Spanish footballers
Footballers from Ourense
Association football midfielders
Segunda División players
Segunda División B players
Tercera División players
CD Ourense footballers
Getafe CF footballers
AD Alcorcón footballers
Real Jaén footballers
UD Melilla footballers
Spanish football managers
UD Melilla managers
CF Gandía players